Suisa is a village in the Tunturi-Suisa panchayat in the Baghmundi CD block in the Jhalda subdivision of the Purulia district in the state of West Bengal, India.

Geography

Location

Suisa is situated at a distance of about 50 km from the district headquarters at Purulia.

Area overview
Purulia district forms the lowest step of the Chota Nagpur Plateau. The general scenario is undulating land with scattered hills. Jhalda subdivision, shown in the map alongside, is located in the western part of the district, bordering Jharkhand. The Subarnarekha flows along a short stretch of its western border. It is an overwhelmingly rural subdivision with 91.02% of the population living in the rural areas and 8.98% living in the urban areas. There are 3 census towns in the subdivision. The map alongside shows some of the tourist attractions in the Ajodhya Hills. The area is home to Purulia Chhau dance with spectacular masks made at Charida. The remnants of old temples and deities are found in the subdivision also, as in other parts of the district.

Note: The map alongside presents some of the notable locations in the subdivision. All places marked in the map are linked in the larger full screen map.

Demographics
According to the 2011 Census of India, Suisa had a total population of 2,649, of which 1,339 (51%) were males and 1,310 (49%) were females. There were 1,310 persons in the age range of 0–6 years. The total number of literate persons in Suisa was 1,541 (67.92% of the population over 6 years).

Transport
There is a station at Suisa on the Chandil-Muri line.

Education
Netaji Subhash Ashram Mahavidyalaya was established in 1985. Affiliated with the Sidho Kanho Birsha University, it offers honours courses in Bengali, English, history and geography and a general course in arts.

Jain influence in the Suisa-Deuli region
Jainism flourished in the western parts of West Bengal during the 10th-13th century. Many temples were built during this period. Purulia district had a large concentration of Jain temples. Apart from three dilapidated temples at Deuli, many statues of Jain tirthankaras and other Jainism-related articles have been found in the area. With some official initiative, these items have been shifted to a local one-roomed museum at Suisa. When the archaeologist J.D.Beglar explored the area in the 1870s, there were many temples.

Among the iconic images that can be seen are large Vishnu sculpture in the unusual tri-bhanga pose, Ambika (broken), a chaturmukha shrine of Rekha type with a seated tirthankara and images of different tirthankaras, and several related images.

“Many scholars believe that a trade route passed through Purulia. The district’s temples and deities are mainly Brahmanical but have Jain influences at several places like Telkupi, Pakbirra, Deulghata, Budhpur and Suisa.”

Suisa picture gallery

References

External links

Villages in Purulia district
Jain temples in West Bengal
Tourist attractions in Purulia district